The Peoples Bank and Loan Building is a historic commercial building at the southwest corner of Spruce and 3rd Streets in Lewisville, Arkansas.  The single-story masonry building was designed by the Texarkana firm of Witt, Seibert & Company and built in 1915, during Lafayette County's timber boom years.  It is one of the few commercial buildings in the county to survive from that period, and is a fine local example of Classical Revival architecture.

The building was listed on the National Register of Historic Places in 1996.

See also
National Register of Historic Places listings in Lafayette County, Arkansas

References

Bank buildings on the National Register of Historic Places in Arkansas
Neoclassical architecture in Arkansas
Commercial buildings completed in 1915
Buildings and structures in Lafayette County, Arkansas
National Register of Historic Places in Lafayette County, Arkansas